Risk magazine provides news and analysis covering the financial industry, with a particular focus on risk management, derivatives and complex finance. It includes articles and papers on credit risk, market risk, risk systems, swap option pricing, derivatives risk and pricing, regulation and asset management. Articles include news, features, comment, analysis and mathematical papers. Risk has a tradition of covers featuring pieces of abstract modern art.

The magazine was founded by Peter Field in 1987. It was owned by Risk Waters Group, then acquired by Incisive Media, and is now owned by Infopro Digital. Editors include: Helen Bartholomew, Philip Alexander, Lukas Becker, Rob Mannix, Tom Osborn and Mauro Cesa, with Kris Devasabai as editor-in-chief. The editorial director is Duncan Wood.

Risk magazine has a sister publication – Asia Risk – focusing on the Asia-Pacific region.

Risk also runs industry-specific events, including the annual Risk awards, and has an extensive global conferences and training program. In 2003, Risk magazine launched a financial risk management website that provides news updates as a digital subscription.

The final print edition of Risk magazine was published in June 2022. The magazine now exists in digital form, via website and app.

Risk.net 
Risk.net is a news and analysis website covering the financial industry, with a particular focus on regulation, derivatives, risk management asset management and commodities. Risk.net publishes on widely reported stories and analytical articles.

Risk.net financial coverage includes operational risk, accounting, FRTB, structured products, valuation adjustments, electronic trading, clearing, interest rate risk, energy, oil, gas, power, Mifid, liquidity risk and Solvency II.

Risk Journals 
Risk Journals deliver peer-reviewed research covering financial risk topics such as credit risk, operational risk, investment strategies, commodities, infrastructures, derivatives, regulation. Each quarter, Risk Journals publish technical papers.

Titles of the journals include: Journal of Risk, Journal of Credit Risk, Journal of Operational Risk, Journal of Financial Market Infrastructures, Journal of Computational Finance, Journal of Risk Model Validation, Journal of Energy Markets, Journal of Network Theory in Finance and Journal of Investment Strategies.

Risk Books 
Risk Books has been publishing and distributing specialist financial risk management books for more than 20 years. There are more than 180 different titles currently in print and digital formats. Risk Books covers a wide range of technical subjects for academics, practitioners, investors and corporate users, ranging from derivatives, hedge funds, quant analysis, credit, regulatory issues and operational risk to the energy, insurance and currency markets.

References

Business magazines published in the United Kingdom
Magazines established in 1987
Magazines published in London
Monthly magazines published in the United Kingdom
Professional and trade magazines
Risk management